The 1948 New York Giants season was the franchise's 66th season. The team finished in fifth place in the National League with a 78–76 record, 13½ games behind the Boston Braves.

Offseason 
 November 20, 1947: 1947 minor league draft
Hoyt Wilhelm was drafted by the Giants from the Boston Braves.
Ed Albrecht was drafted from the Giants by the St. Louis Browns.
Pete Milne was drafted by the Giants from the Cleveland Indians.
 Prior to 1948 season: Marv Grissom was acquired from the Giants by the Sacramento Solons.

Regular season

Season standings

Record vs. opponents

Opening Day lineup

Roster

Player stats

Batting

Starters by position 
Note: Pos = Position; G = Games played; AB = At bats; H = Hits; Avg. = Batting average; HR = Home runs; RBI = Runs batted in

Other batters 
Note: G = Games played; AB = At bats; H = Hits; Avg. = Batting average; HR = Home runs; RBI = Runs batted in

Pitching

Starting pitchers 
Note: G = Games pitched; IP = Innings pitched; W = Wins; L = Losses; ERA = Earned run average; SO = Strikeouts

Other pitchers 
Note: G = Games pitched; IP = Innings pitched; W = Wins; L = Losses; ERA = Earned run average; SO = Strikeouts

Relief pitchers 
Note: G = Games pitched; W = Wins; L = Losses; SV = Saves; ERA = Earned run average; SO = Strikeouts

Farm system 

LEAGUE CHAMPIONS: Sioux City, Trenton, Ogdensburg, Erie, RenoPittsburg franchise moved to Roseville, July 30, 1948

Notes

References 
 1948 New York Giants at Baseball Reference
 1948 New York Giants at Baseball Almanac

New York Giants (NL)
San Francisco Giants seasons
New York Giants season
New York
1940s in Manhattan
Washington Heights, Manhattan